Sot's Hole may refer to:

 Metheringham, a village and civil parish in Lincolnshire, England
 a Local Nature Reserve in the Sandwell Valley in the West Midlands of England